The Long Arm was an Australian television police series shown in April 1970, it ran for 19 episodes.

Synopsis
The series was produced in black-and-white by Ansett Television Films and made in-house by the Ten Network as part of an attempt to rival the popular police dramas produced by Crawford Productions such as Homicide and Division 4. The Long Arm was set in Melbourne, with segments shot in Sydney. Its episodes were based on real-life cases, and it attempted to introduce a soap opera feel by examining the private lives of the detectives. 

The series was produced by Ron Beck and starred Robert Bruning, Sandy Harbutt, Lyndall Moor and Barbara Mason. Kenneth Goodlet and Tony Ward appeared in semi-regular roles.

The series was criticized for some excessively gory make-up on murder victims for its prime time slot. After it was cancelled, Sandy Harbutt adapted an episode he had written into his cult-favorite 1974 biker action film Stone.

References

External links
The Long Arm at Classic Australian Television
The Long Arm at the National Film and Sound Archive

Network 10 original programming
1970s Australian crime television series
1970 Australian television series debuts
1970 Australian television series endings
Black-and-white Australian television shows